Cristina Simion ( born 20 November 1991) is a Romanian female mountain runner, world champion at the World Long Distance Mountain Running Championships (2019).

Biography
Simion in the sport of athletics at senior level was gold medal at the Balkan Athletics Championships (in 2017 in 5000 m) and bronze medal with the national team at the European Cross Country Championships (2016). Twice silver medal with the national team at the European Cross Country Championships (2017) and European 10,000m Cup (2018).

Achievements

References

External links
 

1991 births
Living people
Romanian female long-distance runners
Romanian female cross country runners
Romanian female mountain runners
Place of birth missing (living people)
World Long Distance Mountain Running Championships winners